Tyumentsevo is a rural locality (a selo) and the administrative center of Tyumentsevsky District, Altai Krai, Russia. The population was 5,255 in 2016. There are 45 streets.

Geography 
The village is located in the forest-steppe zone of the West Siberian Plain at the confluence of the Cheremshanka and Medvedka Rivers.

References 

Rural localities in Tyumentsevsky District